Chile competed at the 2015 World Aquatics Championships in Kazan, Russia from 24 July to 9 August 2015.

Diving

Chilean divers qualified for the individual spots and the synchronized teams at the World Championships.

Men

Swimming

Chilean swimmers have achieved qualifying standards in the following events (up to a maximum of 2 swimmers in each event at the A-standard entry time, and 1 at the B-standard):

Men

Women

Synchronized swimming

Chile has qualified two synchronized swimmers to compete in each of the following events.

References

External links
FECHIDA web site

Nations at the 2015 World Aquatics Championships
2015
World Aquatics Championships